Peter II (1340 - June 1408)  was Count of Urgell from 1347 until his death.

Biography

He was the eldest son of count James I of Urgell and Cecilia of Comminges, daughter of the count of Comminges and viscount of Turenne, Bernard VII. At the death of his father, he inherited his titles of Urgell, viscount of Àger, baron of Entença and Antillón; as he was underage, his mother acted initially as tutor.

In 1363 he married Beatrice of Cardona, daughter of Ugo Folch de Cardona. In 1376 he remarried to Margaret Paleologa, daughter of John II, Marquess of Montferrat.

In 1396, after Martin of Aragon had become king of Aragon, he faced Matthew, Count of Foix, who had invaded Aragon, and pushed him back. He died at Balaguer in 1408.

His son with Margaret Paleologa was James II, Count of Urgell.

Sources

 

1340 births
1408 deaths
Counts of Urgell
14th-century Catalan people